The 2008 FIS Ski Jumping Grand Prix was the 15th Summer Grand Prix season in ski jumping on plastic. Season began on 26 July 2008 in Hinterzarten, Germany and ended on 4 October 2008 in Liberec.

Other competitive circuits this season included the World Cup and Continental Cup.

Calendar

Men

Men's team

Standings

Overall

Nations Cup

Four Nations Grand Prix

References 

Grand Prix
FIS Grand Prix Ski Jumping